Christel Bodenstein (born 13 October 1938) is a German film and television actress. She appeared in many  East German (GDR) productions and is best known outside Germany for her leading role as the young princess in The Singing Ringing Tree (1957).

Biography 
In 1949 she moved to Leipzig  in the GDR with her mother. She attended the ballet school of the Leipzig Opera and the State Ballet School, Berlin and became a ballet dancer. She met the film director Kurt Maetzig who suggested she study acting and screen test for a film, she then studied acting at the Academy of Film and Television in Potsdam.

She was married from 1960 to 1978 to the director Konrad Wolf and they had a son Mirko in 1961. Her second marriage is to the actor and playwright Hasso von Lenski.

Filmography 
 The Singing Ringing Tree (1957)
 The Punch Bowl (1959)
 New Year's Eve Punch (1960), sequel to The Punch Bowl (1959).
Viel Lärm um nichts (1964)

External links 

 BBC Radio 4 – The Singing Ringing Tree at bbc.co.uk
 British Singing Ringing Tree fan site
 

1938 births
Living people
German film actresses
German television actresses
Actresses from Munich
20th-century German actresses